The Ministry of Labour, Employment and Social Security is a ministry of labor of different countries:

 Ministry of Labour, Employment and Social Security (Argentina)
 Ministry of Labour, Employment and Social Security (Myanmar)